The Clausura 2018 Liga MX championship stage commonly known as Liguilla (playoffs) was played from 2 May 2018 to 20 May 2018. A total of eight teams competed in the championship stage to decide the champions of the Clausura 2018 Liga MX season. Both finalists qualified to the 2019 CONCACAF Champions League.

Qualified teams

Format
Teams are re-seeded each round.
Team with more goals on aggregate after two matches advances.
Away goals rule is applied in the quarterfinals and semifinals, but not the final.
In the quarterfinals and semifinals, if the two teams are tied on aggregate and away goals, the higher seeded team advances.
In the final, if the two teams are tied after both legs, the match goes to extra time and, if necessary, a shoot-out.
Both finalists qualify to the 2019 CONCACAF Champions League (in Pot 3).

Bracket

Quarterfinals

|}

All times are UTC−5 except for the match in Tijuana (UTC−7)

First leg

Second leg

América won 6–2 on aggregate

Tijuana won 3–2 on aggregate

4–4 on aggregate and tied on away goals. Toluca advanced for being the higher seed in the classification table.

2–2 on aggregate and tied on away goals. Santos Laguna advanced for being the higher seed in the classification table.

Semifinals

|}

All times are UTC−5 except for the match in Tijuana (UTC−7)

First leg

Second leg

Toluca won 5–3 on aggregate

Santos Laguna won 6–3 on aggregate

Finals

|}
All times are UTC−5

First leg

Second leg

Santos Laguna won 3–2 on aggregate

Goalscorers
5 goals
 Fernando Uribe (Toluca)

4 goals
 Julio Furch (Santos Laguna)

3 goals
 Juan Martín Lucero (Tijuana)
 Mateus Uribe (América)

2 goals
 Pablo Barrientos (Toluca)
 Cecilio Domínguez (América)
 Emanuel Loeschbor (Morelia)
 Osvaldo Martínez (Santos Laguna)
 Jérémy Ménez (América)
 Dorlan Pabón (Monterrey)
 Djaniny (Santos Laguna)

1 goal
 Hugo Ayala (UANL)
 Miller Bolaños (Tijuana)
 Cristian Borja (Toluca)
 Nicolás Castillo (UNAM)
 Edwin Cetré (Santos Laguna)
 Luis Chávez (Tijuana)
 Jesús Gallardo (UNAM)
 André-Pierre Gignac (UANL)
 Gabriel Hauche (Toluca)
 Andrés Ibargüen (América)
 Jesus Isijara (Santos Laguna)
 Mario Osuna (Morelia)
 Dorlan Pabón (Monterrey)
 Luis Quiñones (Toluca)
 Ignacio Rivero (Tijuana)
 Jonathan Rodríguez (Santos Laguna)
 Rubens Sambueza (Toluca)
 Miguel Sansores (Morelia)
 Bruno Valdez (América)

References

 
1
Liga MX seasons